John "Needles" Bentley (March 8, 1895 – October 24, 1969) was a professional baseball player.  He was a left-handed pitcher over parts of nine seasons (1913–1916, 1923–1927) with the Washington Senators, New York Giants and Philadelphia Phillies.  For his career, he compiled a 46–33 record in 138 appearances, with a 4.01 ERA (earned run average) and 259 strikeouts.  Bentley was a member of the Giants' pennant-winning teams in 1923 and 1924.  He was 1–3 with a 4.94 ERA and 11 strikeouts in World Series play.

He was a good hitting pitcher in his major league career. In nine seasons, he compiled a .291 average (170-584) with 7 home runs and 71 RBI. In 1923 Bentley batted .427 (38-89) for the New York Giants. In the 1923 and 1924 World Series, he hit .417 (5-12) with one home run and 2 RBI. He would be the last pitcher to pinch-hit in the World Series until Zach Greinke, who pinch-hit in the 2021 World Series. He also played 59 games at first base and 3 games in right field in the majors.

In 1922, Bentley pitched for the minor league Baltimore Orioles in the International League,  going 13–2 with a 1.73 ERA before he was called up again to the Big Leagues by the New York Giants.

He was born in Sandy Spring, Maryland, and later died in Olney, Maryland, at the age of 74.

Bentley was drafted into the military in July 1917. It was thought that he would claim exemption from military service as a conscientious objector due to his religious faith, yet he chose to enlist in the army and serve his country in World War I. In March 1918, Bentley was stationed at Fort Meade, Maryland. Shortly thereafter, he was deployed to France with the 313th Infantry. He documented his experiences through letters sent home throughout his 19 months of service.

See also
 List of Major League Baseball annual saves leaders

References

External links

1895 births
1969 deaths
Major League Baseball pitchers
Baseball players from Maryland
Washington Senators (1901–1960) players
New York Giants (NL) players
Philadelphia Phillies players
People from Sandy Spring, Maryland
Minor league baseball managers
Minneapolis Millers (baseball) players
Baltimore Orioles (IL) players
Newark Bears (IL) players
York White Roses players
Rochester Red Wings players
Elmira Red Wings players